The Union for the Republic is a registered political party in Burkina Faso (formerly Upper Volta). The UPR is currently led by Toussaint Abel Coulibaly. At the legislative elections, 6 May 2007, the party won 5 out of 111 seats.

During the 2014 Burkinabé uprising, protesters raided and burned down Coulibaly's home. He had supported the former government of Blaise Compaoré, who had ruled since he came into power via a coup d'état in 1987.

References

Political parties in Burkina Faso